The 1980 Western Kentucky Hilltoppers football team represented Western Kentucky University as a member of the Ohio Valley Conference (OVC) during the 1980 NCAA Division I-AA football season. Led by 14th-year head coach Jimmy Feix, the Hilltoppers compiled and overall record of 9–1 with a mark of 6–1 in conference play, winning the OVC title. However, Western Kentukcy was not selected for the NCAA Division I_AA Football Championship playoffs. Instead, the OVC's second-place finisher, was invited despite the fact that Western had beaten them earlier in the season. This perceived snub was a factor in Western Kentucky's decision to leave the OVC in 1982.  The Hilltoppers finished the season ranked fifth in final Associated Press poll.

The team's captains were Bryan Gray, Ricky Gwinn, and Pete Walters. Western Kentucky's roster included future National Football League (NFL) players Pete Walters, Davlin Mullen, John Newby, Phil Rich, Troy Snardon, Brad Todd, Donnie Evans, Ray Farmer, Ronnie Fishback, Tom Fox, Paul Gray, Ricky Gwinn, Ron Hunter, Lamont Meacham, and Mike Miller.  Walters and Tim Ford were named to All-American teams and Feix was named OVC Coach of the Year for the third time.  The All-Conference Team included Barry Bumm, Evans, Farmer, Jerry Flippin, Gwinn, Lamont Meacham, Rich, Snardon, and Walters.

Schedule

References

Western Kentucky
Western Kentucky Hilltoppers football seasons
Ohio Valley Conference football champion seasons
{Western Kentucky Hilltoppers football